Olov Hartman (1906–1982) was a Swedish hymnwriter and writer.

1906 births
1982 deaths
Swedish Christian hymnwriters
Swedish male writers
Swedish-language writers